Cangwu County is a county in eastern  Guangxi Zhuang Autonomous Region, China, bordering Guangdong province to the east. It is under the administration of Wuzhou city.

Climate

References

Counties of Guangxi
Wuzhou